The Mercan'Tour Classic Alpes-Maritimes is a French single-day road cycling race held in Valberg in the Alpes-Maritimes region of France. The race was supposed to be first held in 2020, but was cancelled due to the COVID-19. It is classified by the UCI as a category 1.1 event on the UCI Europe Tour.

Winners

References

UCI Europe Tour races
Cycle races in France
Recurring sporting events established in 2020
2020 establishments in France